The 2006 Colonial Athletic Association baseball tournament was held at Brooks Field in Wilmington, North Carolina, from May 24 through 28.  The event determined the champion of the Colonial Athletic Association for the 2006 season.  Fifth-seeded  won the tournament for the second time and earned the CAA's automatic bid to the 2006 NCAA Division I baseball tournament.

Entering the event, former member East Carolina had won the most championships, with seven.  Among active members, Old Dominion and VCU led with three titles while George Mason had won twice and UNC Wilmington and William & Mary had each won once.

Format and seeding
The top six teams from the CAA's round-robin regular season qualified for the tournament.  Teams were seeded by conference winning percentage.  They played a double-elimination tournament.

Bracket and results

All-Tournament Team
The following players were named to the All-Tournament Team.

Most Valuable Player
Chris Hatcher was named Tournament Most Valuable Player.  Hatcher was a catcher for UNC Wilmington.

References

Tournament
Colonial Athletic Association Baseball Tournament
Colonial Athletic Association baseball tournament
Colonial Athletic Association baseball tournament
College baseball tournaments in North Carolina
Baseball competitions in Wilmington, North Carolina